Anolis cooki, also known commonly as Cook's anole, Cook's pallid anole, and the Guanica pallid anole, is a species of lizard in the family Dactyloidae. The species is endemic to Puerto Rico.

Etymology
The specific name, cooki, is in honor of Melville Thurston Cook (1869–1952), who was an American botanist and entomologist.

Geographic range
A. cooki is found in southwestern Puerto Rico, including the island of Caja de Muertos.

Habitat

Description
Females are smaller, attaining  SVL.

Reproduction
A. cooki is oviparous.

Taxonomy
A. cooki was originally described as a subspecies of Anolis cristatellus but raised to species rank in 1966. In 2012 Nicholson et al. "split" the genus Anolis and placed A. cooki in the genus Ctenonotus, a move which has not been widely accepted.

References

Further reading
Gorman GC, Thomas R, Atkins L (1968). "Intra- and interspecific chromosome variation in the lizard Anolis cristatellus and its closest relatives". Breviora (293): 1–13.
Grant C (1931). "A New Species and Two New Sub-species of the Genus Anolis ". Journal of the Department of Agriculture of Porto [sic] Rico 15: 219–222. (Anolis cristatellus cooki, new subspecies, p. 221).
Schwartz A, Henderson RW (1991). Amphibians and Reptiles of the West Indies: Descriptions, Distributions, and Natural History. Gainesville: University of Florida Press. 720 pp. . (Anolis cooki, p. 242).
Schwartz A, Thomas R (1975). A Check-list of West Indian Amphibians and Reptiles. Carnegie Museum of Natural History Special Publication No. 1. Pittsburgh, Pennsylvania: Carnegie Museum of Natural History. 216 pp. (Anolis cooki, pp. 74–75).
Thomas R (1966). "Additional notes on the amphisbaenids of greater Puerto Rico". Breviora (249): 1–23. (Anolis cooki, elevated to species, p. 3).

Anoles
Reptiles of Puerto Rico
Endemic fauna of Puerto Rico
Reptiles described in 1931
Taxa named by Chapman Grant